Hornsea is a town on the East Yorkshire coast in the UK.

Hornsea may also refer to:

Hornsea Wind Farm, operational and planned wind farm off the East Yorkshire coast, North Sea
Hornsea Town railway station, Hornsea, UK
Hornsea Bridge railway station, Hornsea, UK
Hornsea Pottery
Hornsea Town Football Club, playing in Humber Premier League

See also
Hornsey